Nigülesügchi Khan, born Elbeg, (1362–1399) was a khagan of the Northern Yuan dynasty, reigning from 1394 to 1399. Erdeniin Tobchi claimed that Elbeg was the younger brother of the Jorightu Khan, while other historians testify that he was a son of the Biligtü Khan (Emperor Zhaozong). He ruled for seven years. His regnal title "Nigülesügchi Khagan" means "Merciful Emperor" in the Mongolian language. Border skirmishes with the Ming dynasty and Oirat rebellion plagued his reign.

Reign
During his reign, the Oirats began to openly challenge the authority of the Borjigin family and the Ming dynasty repulsed Northern Yuan invasions. Elbeg was charged with responsibility for all things wrong.

Elbeg was hunting with Khuuhai Dayuu and saw hare's blood on the newly fallen snow. He mused: "Is there a lady with a face white as snow and cheeks as red as blood?" Khuuhai responded: "I know just such a beautiful lady. It is forbidden for you to see her, as she is Oljeitu, the wife of your son." The Khan ordered Khuuhai to bring the lady to him. When the Khuuhai informed the princess of the summons, she was greatly angered, for she knew the evil intent in the Khan's heart. She refused to go. The Khan then killed his son Duurentemur and took his daughter-in-law. He made her as his consort. But Khuuhai also killed by Elbeg Khan.

To prevent hostilities from the Khuuhai Dayuu's family, he gave his daughter Samur Gunj in marriage to the Khuuhai Dayuu's son Batula.

Ugetchi Khashikha, who was ruler of the Oirads at the time, resisted the Khagan's decision to appoint a new ruler over his tribes. He persuaded Batula that the violent khan who had killed his own kin was not fit to be Emperor. Batula wanted to avenge the death of his father as well. 

In 1399, Elbeg Nigülesügchi Khagan was defeated by the Four Oirats and was killed by their leaders, Ugetchi Khashikha and Batula, as a result. According to Saghang Sechen, his crown was succeeded by his eldest son Gün Temür Khan after his death. Allied with the late khan's principal consort Kobeguntai, who was jealous of Elbeg's issue with Oljeitu, Ugetchi Khashikha seized his harem and all his properties.

Issue
 Crown prince Duurentemur
 Ajai
 Taisun khan
 Agbarjin
 Manduul khan
Gün Temür Khan (disputed)
Öljei Temür Khan
Samur Gunj

See also
 List of khans of the Northern Yuan dynasty
 Maidilibala

References

1361 births
1399 deaths
14th-century Chinese monarchs
14th-century Mongol rulers
Filicides
Northern Yuan rulers